Joseph Christopher Cleary (December 3, 1918 – June 3, 2004), nicknamed "Fire", was a Major League Baseball pitcher for one game in 1945. The right-hander was born in Cork, and he was the last native of Ireland to appear in a major league game until P. J. Conlon debuted for the New York Mets on May 7, 2018. He also holds the major league record for the highest ERA of any pitcher who retired a batter.

Major League career
Cleary pitched one game in relief for the Washington Senators on August 4, 1945.  In the 4th inning of game 2 of a doubleheader against the Boston Red Sox, he gave up 8 baserunners (5 hits and 3 walks) and 7 earned runs in just  of an inning. The only out that he recorded was a strikeout of opposing pitcher Dave Ferriss.

In Cleary's short MLB career he had a 0–0 record with 1 strikeout and an ERA of 189.00.

Personal life 
Joe Cleary was born in 1918 in Cork, Ireland and moved to the Upper West Side of New York City in 1928. Cleary attended Commerce High School where he played baseball, once headlining The New York Times. Later, whilst still enrolled at Commerce, Cleary played on various semi-professional teams in Brooklyn in order to supplement his father's income. Such teams included the Brooklyn Bay Parkways and the Puerto Rican Stars.

He died at the age of 85 in Yonkers, New York.

See also
List of players from Ireland in Major League Baseball

References

External links

1918 births
2004 deaths
Washington Senators (1901–1960) players
Major League Baseball pitchers
Major League Baseball players from Ireland
Irish baseball players
Orlando Senators players
Charlotte Hornets (baseball) players
Chattanooga Lookouts players
Buffalo Bisons (minor league) players
Jersey City Giants players
Gainesville G-Men players
Charleston Rebels players
Augusta Tigers players
Anniston Rams players
Greensburg Green Sox players
Burials at Gate of Heaven Cemetery (Hawthorne, New York)
Baseball players from New York City
Sportspeople from Cork (city)
Irish emigrants to the United States